Krchleby may refer to places in the Czech Republic:

Krchleby (Kutná Hora District), a municipality and village in the Central Bohemian Region
Krchleby (Nymburk District), a municipality and village in the Central Bohemian Region
Krchleby (Rychnov nad Kněžnou District), a municipality and village in the Hradec Králové Region
Krchleby (Šumperk District), a municipality and village in the Olomouc Region
Krchleby, a village and part of Křečovice in the Central Bohemian Region
Krchleby, a village and part of Staňkov (Domažlice District) in the Plzeň Region